Desportivo Chimoio, usually known simply as Desportivo Chimoio, is a traditional football (soccer) club based in Chimoio, West Mozambique.

Stadium
The club plays their home matches at Katdarra, which has a maximum capacity of 10,000 people.

References

Football clubs in Mozambique